Morciano di Romagna ( or ) is a comune (municipality) in the Province of Rimini in the Italian region Emilia-Romagna. The Conca flows past the town.

References

External links
 Official website

Cities and towns in Emilia-Romagna